Pledge Night is a 1990 American slasher film directed and edited by Paul Ziller. Its plot follows a college fraternity that incurs the wrath of a deceased pledge named Sid, who died during a hazing years prior. The film's soundtrack is provided by the American heavy metal band Anthrax, and the film also features the band's lead singer Joey Belladonna as a young version of Sid.

Plot
To become a fraternity member, the applicants have to go through initiation rituals to show their loyalty. Back in the 1960s, someone played a nasty trick on the student Sidney Scheider: He had to take a bath in a tub filled with cornflakes and coffee grounds, vinegar, and even more disgusting substances. But someone had replaced the water with pure acid. Sidney was seriously wounded and died a horrible death. This year Acid Sid returns with a vengeance, killing everyone who comes his way.

Cast
 Todd Eastland as Bonner
 Shannon McMahon as Wendy
 Will Kempe as Acid Sid
 Joey Belladonna as Young Sid
 Dennis Sullivan as Bodine
 Craig Derrick as Cagle
 David Neal Evans as Goodman
 Robert Lentini as Silvera
 James Davies as Zahn
 Lawton Paseka as J.D.

Production

Development
The film was initially titled A Hazing in Hell.

Filming
Pledge Night was filmed at the Delta Phi fraternity house at Rutgers University in New Brunswick, New Jersey.

Music
The film's soundtrack was provided by the American band Anthrax.

Home media
In 2019, Pledge Night was released on Blu-ray and DVD by Vinegar Syndrome.

References

Bibliography

External links
 

1990 films
American slasher films
American independent films
1990 horror films
Films about fraternities and sororities
Films directed by Paul Ziller
1990s English-language films
1990s American films